Chamier may refer to:

 Daniel Chamier (1564–1621), minister of religion in France
 Anthony Chamier (1725–1780), British official
 Frederick Chamier (1796–1870), novelist
 George Chamier (1842–1915), New Zealand engineer and novelist
 Adrian Chamier, Air Commodore, "the founding father of the Air Training Corps", husband of Edwina Chamier
 Edwina Chamier, Canadian skiing champion, wife of Adrian Chamier
 Edward Chamier (1840–1892), French chess master
 Chamier (horse), winner of the Irish Derby Stakes, 1953
 Coulounieix-Chamiers, Dordogne, France

Surnames of French origin